Chris Blair (born 4 March 1978 in Invercargill, New Zealand) is a male badminton player from New Zealand. At the 1998 Commonwealth Games he won a bronze medal in the men's team event. Four years later at the 2002 Commonwealth Games he won a bronze medal in the mixed team event.

References

1978 births
Living people
New Zealand male badminton players
Commonwealth Games bronze medallists for New Zealand
Badminton players at the 1998 Commonwealth Games
Badminton players at the 2002 Commonwealth Games
Commonwealth Games medallists in badminton
20th-century New Zealand people
21st-century New Zealand people
Medallists at the 1998 Commonwealth Games
Medallists at the 2002 Commonwealth Games